The 2021 Cincinnati mayoral election took place on November 2, 2021, to elect the Mayor of Cincinnati, Ohio. The election was officially nonpartisan, with the top two candidates from the primary election on May 4, 2021, advancing to the general election, regardless of party. Incumbent Democratic Mayor John Cranley, first elected in 2013, was term-limited and could not seek reelection to a third consecutive term. Democratic Hamilton County clerk of court Aftab Pureval won the election over fellow Democrat and former Congressman David S. Mann.

Primary election

Candidates

Declared
Gavi Begtrup (D) – Small business owner, former policy advisor for U.S. Representative from Arizona Gabby Giffords
David Mann (D) – City councillor (1974–1992, 2013–present), former Mayor of Cincinnati (1980–1982, 1991), former U.S. Representative from Ohio's 1st congressional district (1993–1995)
Herman Najoli (I) – Adjunct professor at Indiana Wesleyan University
Raffel Prophett (D) – Retired firefighter
Aftab Pureval (D) – Hamilton County Clerk of Courts (2017–present), nominee for Ohio's 1st congressional district in 2018
Cecil Thomas (D) – State senator for the 9th district (2015–present), former city councillor (2005–2013)

Disqualified
Adam Koehler (I), tech entrepreneur
Kelli Prather (D), community activist and perennial candidate
Wendell Young (D), city councillor

Withdrawn
P.G. Sittenfeld (D), city councillor and candidate for U.S. Senate in 2016

Declined
Mark Mallory (D), director of community development at FC Cincinnati and former Mayor of Cincinnati (Endorsed Aftab Pureval)
David Pepper (D), former chair of the Ohio Democratic Party, former Hamilton County commissioner, and nominee for Attorney General of Ohio in 2014
Chris Seelbach (D), city councillor
Christopher Smitherman (I), Vice Mayor and city councillor (Endorsed David Mann)

Polling

Endorsements

Results

General election

Candidates
David Mann, city councillor (Democratic Party)
Aftab Pureval, Hamilton County Clerk of Courts (Democratic Party)

Endorsements

Fundraising

Debates

Results

Notes

References

External links
Official campaign websites
 Gavi Begtrup (D) for Mayor
 David S. Mann (D) for Mayor 
 Herman Najoli (I) for Mayor
 Raffel Prophett (D) for Mayor
 Aftab Pureval (D) for Mayor
 Cecil Thomas (D) for Mayor

Mayoral elections in Cincinnati
Cincinnati
Cincinnati
Cincinnati